Santa Maria do Cambucá is a city in Pernambuco, Brazil.

Geography
 State - Pernambuco
 Region - Agreste Pernambucano
 Boundaries - Paraiba   (N);  Frei Miguelinho   (S);  Surubim and Vertentes do Lério   (E);   Vertentes   (W)
 Area - 92.14 km2
 Elevation - 494 m
 Hydrography - Capibaribe river
 Vegetation - Subcaducifólia forest
 Climate - semi arid hot
 Annual average temperature - 23.0 c
 Distance to Recife - 153 km
 Population - 14,223 (2020)

Economy
The main economic activities in Santa Maria do Cambucá are general industry,  and agribusiness especially plantations of beans; and farming of cattle, sheep, goats and chickens.

Economic indicators

Economy by Sector
2006

Health indicators

References

Municipalities in Pernambuco